Paracalanus parvus is a copepod found throughout the world, except the Arctic.

Description

Distribution
P. parvus is nearly cosmopolitan, found in waters throughout the world, with the exception of the Arctic.

Ecology

Life cycle and reproduction
P. parvus breeds continuously, although its abundance and egg production rate vary seasonally, with it being abundant from April to December. Its egg production rate is positively correlated to temperature and concentrations of chlorophyll a.

References

Calanoida
Cosmopolitan arthropods
Crustaceans of the Atlantic Ocean
Crustaceans of the Indian Ocean
Crustaceans of the Pacific Ocean
Crustaceans described in 1863